Thaitanium is a Thai American hip hop music group. Among the first of Thai rap artists, the group formed in 2000 by K.H. - Khanngoen "Khan" Nuanual, P. Cess - Prinya "Way" Intachai, Sunny Day - Nay Mayo "Day" Thot.

Group history

"Thaitanium has been a household name in hiphop for over a decade in Thailand." Their first two albums, AA and Thai Riders, were produced and recorded in New York City and released in Thailand in 2000 and 2002. Subsequent album releases cemented the group's popularity in Thailand, where it was played in night clubs, bars and at music festivals. Their popularity in other surrounding countries grew over time as well. They have toured and performed all over the world - in the United States as well as all over Asia - such as Japan, Malaysia, Singapore and elsewhere.

The group performed the soundtrack to the Thai film Province 77, about Thai people living in Los Angeles. Thaitanium was featured on "Dangerous", a track by Thai pop singer Tata Young in 2005. The group performed at the 2006 MTV Asia Awards, joining Simon Webbe in a performance of "No Worries." The group also opened for Fort Minor and 50 Cent in a concert in February 2006 at Aktiv Square, Mueang Thong Thani in Bangkok. It is unknown if this was in fact authorized as the group was subsequently escorted out from the concert. The group then released its fifth album, Thailand's Most Wanted and supported it with its first adult film "MTV Live: Thaitanium Uncensored" on 15 November 2006 at BEC-TERO Hall. "Reven" Thaitanium's Album called "Still Resisting" was released on June 8, 2010. It includes hit songs such as "Long Loey (หลงเลย) [Feat. แบงค์ Clash & สิงห์ Sqweez Animal]" and "Yapper" and the single "No Stoppin' Us" featuring Lil Fame of M.O.P and Blahzay Blahzay. Thaitanium has released numerous hit singles with music videos  - including one featuring Snoop Dogg called "WAKE UP (Bangkok City)" in 2014. Thaitanium's latest album, "Now" was released August 25, 2017.

Currently the Thaitanium members work on their own projects as well as their collective music. Khun and Day started their own clothing line called "9Face". DJ.Buddha has as well - his popular "RUN BKK" hats and t-shirts are like the "I Love NY" shirts of Thailand. Way is an entrepreneur himself who started and owns his own successful chain of unique barber shops called Never Say Cutz which has also become a successful brand, NVSC Supply Co., with their own line of hair products, apparel collection and more - as described by Vice Magazine "This whole trend started with Never Say Cutz—a spot that popularized the whole notion of a hip barbershop in the first place. That shop has a more hip-hop feel to it. The shop is associated with the Thai rap group Thaitaninum. Today, it's Bangkok's flagship barbershop.".

Profiles

Khaneng Nuenuan, also known as Khan or King of Da Hustle, was born on September 4, 1976. His hobbies are listening to music and reading books. His favorite kinds of music are hip hop, rap, jazz and reggae.  He likes playing basketball and skateboarding. If Khan wasn't a singer, he would have been a songwriter.
Jumrut  Tutsanalawat, also known as Day or Sunny Day, was born on September 25, 1976. Day is also of Burmese ethnicity. One of his hobbies is listening to music. He also likes hip hop and jazz. Basketball and Skateboarding are his favorite sports. If Day wasn't a singer he would have been a real estate agent. Prinya  Intachai, also known as Way, P-Way, P CESS, but most notably in music as DaBoyWay, was born on January 10, 1981. His hobbies are playing basketball and listening to music. Way, also known as DaBoyWay, not only acts in his own music videos, but has also acted in several films listed under Prinya Intachai. He and his wife are both entrepreneurs running their own successful brands and businesses. He is married to Nana Rybena. She gave birth to twins in 2013, and the couple are now raising their daughter Bena and son Brooklyn Guy together.

Others
Presenter of advertising mobile i-mobile309.
Ambassador of Toyota Yaris Me and present of Yaris Me.
Created 2 songs with 2 AA for Coke advertising named Song Kran and Coca-Cola. These songs are featured in the album Back At It : The Compilation Vol.2

Discography

Studio albums
AA (2000)
Thai Riders (2002)
Province 77 (movie soundtrack) (2003)
R.A.S. (Resisting Against da System) (2004)
Thailand's Most Wanted (2006)
Flipside (2008)
Thaitanium Limited Edition (2008)
Still Resisting (2010)
Thaitanium (2014)
"16 Years" (2016)
NOW (2017)

Compilations
Thaitanium Mix Tape Volume 1
Thaitanium Mix Tape Volume 2
Thaitanium Mix Tape Volume 3
Thaitanium Mix Tape Volume 4
Thaitanium Mix Tape: The Collection
Thaitanium Mix Tape Volume 5
Thaitanium Mix Tape Volume 6

Guest appearances
"Dangerous", Tata Young, Dangerous Tata (2005)
"Love Me, Hate the Game", M-Flo loves Chan, Thaitanium, Edison Chen, Ryohei Cosmicolor (2007)
"Won (Remix)" The Peach Band
"No.1 Lady" Panadda Ruangwut
"Sam-red-eang" Kidnapper
"Knock Knock" Gift-Monotone
"Seang-Tee-Tam-Ha" Sleeping Sheep
"Hey Lover" Nop Ponchamni
"Let's Get Down" Golf-Mike Feat.Khan Thaitanium, Get Ready (2008)
"Ja" Sek Loso Feat. Khan Thaitanium(2010)
"Hey Sexy" CASH, CASH (2008)
"Ruang-Tam-Ma-Da" Super Strings feat.Way Thaitanium, Kalawitat(2008)
"Marabahaya", E.A.R. Project
"Southeast A", E.A.R. Project
"My Lady", Suburban, ONE
"Ja-Jeeb-Ko-Bok-Na" Nanny Bell Girly berry
"Long Loey", Bank Clash(2010)
"Mahanakorn Bangkok City", Thaitanium Ft.Da Endorphine ( December 2010)
"All the Way Up" (Fat Joe and Remy Ma song 2016) The Asian remix was released, featuring Jay Park, AK-69, DaboyWay, SonaOne and Joe Flizzow.

Studio albums
MTV Asia Awards 2006  -  Most popular singer  branch
Fast Awards 	-	Best Group of the year.
Seed Awards - Best Group of The Year
See San Awards   - Best Hip Hop Album of The Year
AVIMA 2009 - Best Hip Hop Group with Dice & K9 (Mobbstarr) from Philippine

Portfolio

Drama
ละครซีรีส์ "รักทีนเอตต้องเกรดเอ" (แสดงร่วมกับศิลปินวง ทีนเอตเกรดเอ) ออกอากาศทางช่อง 5 (พ.ศ. 2541)
ละครโทรทัศน์ "วัยอลวน อลวนหนนี้...ไม่มีถอย" ออกอากาศทางช่อง 3 คู่กับ อัจฉรา เคิร์ก (พ.ศ. 2542)
ละครซีรีส์ "Six The Series เรื่องคืนนั้น... ยังจำไม่ลืม ตอน Promise " (แสดงร่วมกับศิลปินวง ทีนเอตเกรดเอ) ออกอากาศทางไลน์ทีวี (พ.ศ. 2564)

Films
303 กลัว กล้า อาฆาต (พ.ศ. 2541)
จังหวัด 77 (พ.ศ. 2545)
From an Objective Point of View (พ.ศ. 2545)
Rhythm of the Saints (พ.ศ. 2546)
Spit (พ.ศ. 2548)
History (พ.ศ. 2550)
Word on the Street (พ.ศ. 2551)
Just Another Hustle (พ.ศ. 2552)
The Prince and Me 4 (พ.ศ. 2552)
มายเบสต์บอดีการ์ด (พ.ศ. 2553)
Mindfulness and Murder สติ สืบ ศพ (พ.ศ. 2553)
Choice คู่ซี้ดีแต่ฝัน (พ.ศ. 2556)
โกงพลิกเกม Game Changer (พ.ศ. 2564)

Awards

References
Klangboonkrong, Manta. November 10, 2006. "Thaitanium's mettle", The Nation, Weekend, Page 6 (print edition).
ข่าวบันเทิง ดารา นักร้อง | MSN บันเทิง (translated) September 5, 2012. "Profile"
Thaitanium – UNBREAKABLE Concert September 5, 2012. "Guest appearances and advertising"
ประวัติ ไทเทเนี่ยม (Thaitanium) โดยย่อ..... (translated) September 6, 2012. "Awards"
ฟังเพลงใหม่ออนไลน์ โหลดเพลงฮิตฟรี เพลงใหม่ๆ เพลงใหม่ล่าสุด MV : You2play.com (translated) September 6, 2012. "Concert"
Nana is pregnant with twins September 6, 2012. "Nana is pregnant"

Notes

External links

 Official site

Thai hip hop groups
Musical groups established in 2000